The 42nd Virginia Cavalry Battalion was a cavalry battalion raised in Virginia for service in the Confederate States Army during the American Civil War. It fought mostly as part of the Army of Northern Virginia.

Virginia's 42nd Cavalry Battalion was organized in September, 1863, by consolidating the 32nd and 40th Battalions Virginia Cavalry. The unit contained eight companies and served in the Department of Richmond. During May, 1864, it contained 216 effectives and in June merged into the 24th Virginia Cavalry Regiment. Lieutenant Colonel William T. Robins and Major John R. Robertson were in command.

See also

List of Virginia Civil War units

References

Units and formations of the Confederate States Army from Virginia
1863 establishments in Virginia
Military units and formations established in 1863
1865 disestablishments in Virginia
Military units and formations disestablished in 1865